Starooskolsky District is an administrative district (raion), one of the twenty-one in Belgorod Oblast, Russia. It is located in the north of the oblast. Its administrative center is the city of Stary Oskol (which is not administratively a part of the district). Population:  35,063 (2002 Census);

Administrative and municipal status
Within the framework of administrative divisions, Starooskolsky District is one of the twenty-one in the oblast. The city of Stary Oskol serves as its administrative center, despite being incorporated separately as a town of oblast significance—an administrative unit with the status equal to that of the districts.

As a municipal division, the territory of the district and the territory of the city of oblast significance of Stary Oskol are incorporated together as Starooskolsky Urban Okrug.

References

Notes

Sources

Districts of Belgorod Oblast
 

